The Mat is a river in north-central Albania. The main tributary is Fan, flowing from the northeast, while the Mat flows from the southwest down to the confluence with Fan and then towards the Adriatic Sea.

Etymology
The Albanian name mat originally meant "elevated location", "mountain place". Today's meaning in Albanian, "river bank, river shore", is a consequence of a secondary change through the common use of both the terms mal, "mountain" and breg, "shore", giving the meaning of "elevation". The river was recorded by Roman writer Vibius Sequester (4th or 5th century AD) as Mathis, following a hellenized graphic mode of the term mat. It appeared in written records also as Mathia in 1380.

Overview

Mat originates from the confluence of several streams within the karstic mountains in Martanesh, where it forms deep gorges and canyons. Rising in Martanesh, the Mat heads westwards to the municipality of Mat and northwest through the towns of Klos and Burrel. After passing through a hydroelectric dam, it flows through another, smaller reservoir (Liqeni i Shkopetit – "Lake Shkopet") and forms a narrow gorge through the mountain range that separates Mat District from the coastal plains. It enters the plains between Milot and Zejmen.

Gallery

See also 
 
 Mat (region)
 Geography of Albania
 Central Mountain Range
 Rivers of Albania

Sources

Citations

Bibliography

Rivers of Albania
Geography of Dibër County
Geography of Lezhë County
Drainage basins of the Adriatic Sea
Braided rivers in Albania